Armand Mouyal (13 October 1925 – 15 July 1988) was a French epee world champion fencer.

Early and personal life

Born in Oran, French Algeria, Mouyal was Jewish.

Fencing career 
Mouyal began fencing in the early 1950s.

National championships
Mouyal, a French police officer, won the French national individual épée title in 1952, 1953, 1954, 1957, and 1959.

World championships
Mouyal won the world individual épée championship in 1957.

He participated in team épée, winning a world championship gold medal in 1951; silver in 1953, 1955, 1961, and 1963; and bronze 1954 and 1958.

World rankings
Mouyal was ranked No. 5 in the world in 1955, and 8th in 1956.

Olympics
He was eliminated in the first round of the individual event and the second round of the team event at the 1952 Summer Olympics.

He was a member of the French team that won a bronze medal in team épée at the 1956 Summer Olympics. He advanced to the semifinals in individual épée.

At the 1960 Summer Olympics, he placed seventh in individual épée, reaching the finals, and the French épée team was eliminated in the second round.

Hall of Fame
Mouyal was inducted into the International Jewish Sports Hall of Fame in 1988.

See also
List of select Jewish fencers

References

External links
Jewish Sports bio
Jews in Sports bio
Jewish Sports Legends bio

1925 births
1988 deaths
Sportspeople from Oran
Fencers at the 1952 Summer Olympics
Fencers at the 1956 Summer Olympics
Fencers at the 1960 Summer Olympics
French male épée fencers
Jewish French sportspeople
French police officers
Jewish male épée fencers
Olympic bronze medalists for France
Olympic fencers of France
Olympic medalists in fencing
International Jewish Sports Hall of Fame inductees
Medalists at the 1956 Summer Olympics
Algerian Jews